The 1954 Baylor Bears football team represented Baylor University in the 1954 college football season. The team finished with a record of 7–4 and lost the Gator Bowl to Auburn University, 13–33. Players L. G. Dupre (halfback) and James Ray Smith (tackle) played in the North–South All-Star Game; Smith, Billy Hooper (quarterback), Del Shofner (halfback) and Henry Gremminger (end) were selected as All-Conference players.

Schedule

References

Baylor
Baylor Bears football seasons
Baylor Bears football